Ramadane Ben Abdelmalek Stadium is a multi-use stadium in Constantine, Algeria.  It is currently used mostly for football matches.  The stadium holds 13,000 people. It serves as a home ground for MO Constantine and CS Constantine.

References

Football venues in Algeria
Sports venues in Algeria
Buildings and structures in Constantine, Algeria